Bernadette ‘Bernie’ Farrelly is a former camogie player, winner of the Gradam Tailte award for skill tests in 1987 and 1988. She is a member of the Kildare camogie team of the millennium and of Kildare teams that won the All Ireland junior championship in 1987, 1989 and 1990 and Junior National League in 1986, 1989 and 1990.

References

Living people
Year of birth missing (living people)
Kildare camogie players